In No Sense? Nonsense! is the third full-length album by Art of Noise, recorded in 1987 and released in September that year. By the time of its recording, the group had been reduced to a duo, with the engineer Gary Langan leaving the previous year; Langan's mix engineering work was taken over by Bob Kraushaar and Ted Hayton for this album, but the music was produced entirely by Anne Dudley and J.J. Jeczalik. With this album, the group expanded its sound to include rock and orchestral instrumentation, in addition to its trademark sampling.

Many of the album's tracks are seamlessly segued; ambient soundscapes blend into percussive rhythms, dramatic buildups, melodic string arrangements, clarinet ensemble arrangements, and vocal choruses and chants. The sounds of various forms of transport are a recurrent theme. Musical motifs from "Dragnet", "Galleons of Stone" and "Ode to Don Jose" recur throughout the album. In addition, "Roundabout 727" samples "A Nation Rejects", a B-side from the In Visible Silence album.

The original LP and cassette releases end side A with "E.F.L." and resume with "Ode to Don Jose" on side B. For the CD pressings that followed, "Don Jose" and its following track, "A Day at the Races", were swapped. To compensate for the change, the field recording from the end of "Don Jose" were appended to "E.F.L." instead. Some cassette pressings of this album have the same program recorded on both sides, due to the advantages of C90 tape and the desire to keep the album as one continuous piece.

"Ransom on the Sand" is sampled in "Melt", the fourth track of Leftfield's 1995 album Leftism.

On 2 November 2018, the album was re-released in a new, expanded "deluxe" format alongside 20+ remixes, 12" versions and expanded versions of the original tracks on the album, including many tracks which didn't make the original album first time around.  Some of these were originally featured in the band's track "Acton Art", which formed part of the B side package of the single and 12" versions of the band's track "Dragnet".

Track listing
 "Galleons of Stone" (Jeczalik)
 "Dragnet" (Walter Schumann)
 "Fin Du Temps" (Dudley, Jeczalik)
 "How Rapid?" (Dudley, Jeczalik)
 "Opus for Four" (Dudley, Jeczalik)
 "Debut" (Dudley)
 "E.F.L." (Dudley, Jeczalik)
 "Ode to Don Jose" (Dudley, Jeczalik)
 "A Day at the Races" (Dudley, Jeczalik)
 "Counterpoint" (Dudley, Jeczalik)
 "Roundabout 727" (Dudley, Jeczalik)
 "Ransom on the Sand" (Jeczalik)
 "Roller 1" (Dudley, Jeczalik)
 "Nothing was going to stop them then, anyway" (Dudley, Jeczalik)
 "Crusoe" (Dudley, Jeczalik)
 "One Earth" (Dudley, Jeczalik)

References

External links

Art of Noise albums
1987 albums
China Records albums
Chrysalis Records albums